Koenigia alpina (synonym Aconogonon alpinum), commonly known as alpine knotweed, is similar to Koenigia alaskana, but differs in leaf size and achene characteristics. It is native to Europe and temperate Asia.

It is one of the parents of the cultivated hybrid Koenigia × fennica, the other being Koenigia weyrichii.

References

Polygonoideae
Flora of Central Asia
Flora of Central Europe
Flora of Eastern Asia
Flora of Eastern Europe
Flora of Siberia
Flora of Southeastern Europe
Flora of Southwestern Europe
Flora of the Caucasus
Flora of the Russian Far East
Plants described in 1895